Alexander Blake Schwarzenbach (born May 21, 1967) is an American musician. He is the singer and guitarist of Jawbreaker (1986–1996; 2017–present), and was also a member of Jets to Brazil (1997–2003), The Thorns of Life (2008–2009), and forgetters (2009–2013). Although experiencing little mainstream success himself, Schwarzenbach and groups he has been a member of have influenced a variety of musical groups.

Early life and education
Schwarzenbach spent his early childhood in Berkeley, California, Portland, Oregon, and Boulder, Colorado. Upon moving to Venice, Los Angeles, California to live with his father, he attended the Crossroads School, a private K-12 school in Santa Monica, California. He then attended New York University between 1985 and 1991, including a two-quarter stint at UC Santa Cruz in 1985. He received a Bachelor of Arts degree from NYU in English literature and creative writing in 1991.

Musical career

Jawbreaker

Jawbreaker formed in 1986 after Blake Schwarzenbach and drummer Adam Pfahler responded to a flyer that bassist Chris Bauermeister posted in a New York University dorm cafeteria. The band played their first show as Jawbreaker on March 16, 1989 at Club 88 in Los Angeles, CA. Jawbreaker disbanded in the summer of 1996. They had played together for ten years and released four albums. Their last show was on May 19, 1996 at the Capitol Theater in Olympia, WA.

On April 19, 2017, Jawbreaker announced that they were reuniting after a 21-year hiatus, and has since performed numerous live shows. They are also considering writing new material.

Jets to Brazil

Schwarzenbach then formed the indie band Jets to Brazil in 1997 with Jeremy Chatelain of Handsome and Chris Daly of Texas is the Reason. Jets to Brazil released three albums before disbanding after their summer tour in 2003.

The Thorns of life

In October 2008, Blake revealed that he recently started writing music for a then "as-yet-unnamed group" with drummer Aaron Cometbus (formerly of Crimpshrine) and bassist Daniel Sea, formerly of the Gr'ups and Cypher in the Snow, but best known for their recurring role on television's The L Word. The band has since been named The Thorns of Life. As of November 2008, the group has played a couple of shows in Brooklyn, with videos and reviews available online.

Blake informed via Facebook:

In early 2009, Cometbus left the band quietly. Although there has been no official announcement, many assume that The Thorns of Life are no more.  Their break-up was announced on punknews.org as an official break-up.

forgetters

On August 23, 2009, Blake announced via Facebook information on his new band, forgetters.

Musical influence
Schwarzenbach largely remains an influential figure in the punk/emo/indie music scene. He is known as "one of the godfathers of emo". He has a devoted following from musicians in the genre, particularly for his songs while playing in Jawbreaker, as shown by the variety of groups who paid tribute to the band on the 2003 Jawbreaker tribute album Bad Scene, Everyone's Fault. Blake was a character in the online game Emogame 2. The main character, "Blake", in Nothing Nice To Say, a webcomic, is named after him and bears a resemblance to the singer. The folk punk band Defiance, Ohio's song "I'm Just Going To Leave..." refers to listening to Jawbreaker, as does the song "I Must Be Hateful" by Lagwagon. The Get Up Kids song "I'll Catch You" refers to the Jawbreaker song "Jinx Removing". The Smoking Popes song "You Spoke To Me" is a tribute to Schwarzenbach's influence on the life of lead singer Josh Caterer. The Pootie song "What Will They Think?" has a few Jawbreaker references as well. He is also mentioned in an Eve 6 song, "Friend of Mine"; with the lyric, " remember that Blake said to 'make sure you wake and help save your generation'". "Without Eyes Still Seeing" by Rocky Votolato is another song that references Schwarzenbach in the line, "Dylan, Drake, even Schwarzenbach
How you became heroes I'll never forget." Post-punk band 'Count Florida', from Scotland, released a digital single in February 2021 with an entire song devoted to him; "Blake".

Non-musical activities

Video game reviews
During the summer of 1997, Schwarzenbach worked as a freelance writer and contributed several reviews of video games for GameSpot. Games reviewed included Independence Day, HeliCOPS, and Pandemonium.

Politics
Blake was involved in some efforts of Punk Voter leading up to the 2004 U.S. presidential election. In October 2004, he wrote a "guest column" called "Empires" on Punk Voter's website. Additionally, Blake was peripherally involved with the New York University antiwar protests of late 2002-early 2003.  On March 27, 2003, Blake gave an antiwar speech, entitled "See How We Are", to a crowd assembled in Washington Square Park following a student walkout.

Writing and art
In 2004, Samantha Gillison commented on Blake's literary and artistic endeavors in City Pages:

Teaching
As of June 2022, Schwarzenbach teaches undergraduates as a member of the Adjunct Faculty in the Department of English at Hunter College, which is part of the CUNY public university system in New York City.

References

External links 

Collection of Jawbreaker lyrics: Complete Jawbreaker Page: Lyrics and Songs

1967 births
20th-century American singers
21st-century American singers
Alternative rock guitarists
Alternative rock pianists
Alternative rock singers
American academics of English literature
American indie rock musicians
American lyricists
American male guitarists
American male singer-songwriters
American punk rock guitarists
American punk rock singers
American rock pianists
American male pianists
American rock songwriters
Hunter College faculty
Living people
Musicians from Berkeley, California
New York University alumni
Singer-songwriters from California
Singers from New York City
University of California, Santa Cruz alumni
Crossroads School alumni
20th-century American guitarists
21st-century American guitarists
20th-century American pianists
21st-century American pianists
Guitarists from California
Guitarists from New York City
American male non-fiction writers
20th-century American male singers
21st-century American male singers
Singer-songwriters from New York (state)